"Mary Queen of Arkansas" is a song by Bruce Springsteen from the album Greetings from Asbury Park, N.J., released in 1973.  Springsteen played "Mary Queen of Arkansas" at his audition for John H. Hammond at CBS Records, who signed him to his first record contract on May 2, 1972, although Hammond was less impressed with this song than with "It's Hard to Be a Saint in the City" or with "Growin' Up". The day after signing the contract, Springsteen recorded "Mary Queen of Arkansas" as part of a 12-song demo for Hammond.  The demo version of the song was released on Tracks in 1998.

Themes 
The song is one of the slower tracks on Greetings from Asbury Park, N.J., played on acoustic guitar, and the lyrics of the song may be about a drag queen.  Bruce confirmed this at a concert in Pittsburgh, Pennsylvania at the Soldiers and Sailors Hall on 5-22-14 while speaking to the audience.   The lyrics are dense and reminiscent of  Bob Dylan. "Mary Queen Of Arkansas" is a slow, quiet acoustic song with a faint country feel to it. The lyrics contain repeated references to the circus (a theme explored further on his The Wild, the Innocent & the E-Street Shuffle) as in "Well I'm just a lonely acrobat, the live wire is my trade" and "The big top is for dreamers, we can take the circus all the way to the border." It comes across as a love song dedicated to "Mary."

Personnel
According to authors Philippe Margotin and Jean-Michel Guesdon:
Bruce Springsteen – vocals, guitar, harmonica

References

1973 songs
Bruce Springsteen songs
Songs written by Bruce Springsteen
Song recordings produced by Mike Appel